Cybister explanatus is a species of beetle in the family Dytiscidae.

Use as food 
The adults of this species are edible and are eaten roasted and as a taco filling in Mexico.

References 

Edible insects
Beetles and humans
Beetles of North America
Beetles described in 1852
Dytiscidae